The women's moguls event in freestyle skiing at the 2010 Winter Olympics in Vancouver, Canada took place February 13 at Cypress Bowl Ski Area. The qualification event started at 4:30 PM PST and the final event took place at 7:30 PM PST.

Results

Qualification
The qualification was held at 16:30.

Final
The final was held at 19:30.

References 

Women's freestyle skiing at the 2010 Winter Olympics
Women's events at the 2010 Winter Olympics